Symphonic Dances, Op. 45, is an orchestral suite in three movements completed in October 1940 by Russian composer Sergei Rachmaninoff. It is his final major composition, and his only piece written in its entirety while living in the United States.

The work allowed him to indulge in a nostalgia for the Russia he had known, much as he had done in the Symphony No. 3, as well as to effectively sum up his lifelong fascination with ecclesiastical chants. In the first dance, he quotes the opening theme of his Symphony No. 1, itself derived from motifs characteristic of Russian church music. In the finale he quotes both the Dies Irae and the chant "Blessed art thou, Lord" (Blagosloven yesi, Gospodi) from his All-Night Vigil.

Background
Rachmaninoff composed the Symphonic Dances four years after his Third Symphony, mostly at the Honeyman estate, "Orchard Point", in Centerport, New York, overlooking Long Island Sound. Its original name was Fantastic Dances, with movement titles of "Noon", "Twilight", and "Midnight". While the composer had written to conductor Eugene Ormandy in late August 1940 that the piece was finished and needed only to be orchestrated, the manuscript for the full score bears completion dates of September and October 1940. It was premiered by Ormandy and the Philadelphia Orchestra, to whom it is dedicated, on January 3, 1941.

The work is fully representative of the composer's later style with its curious, shifting harmonies, the almost Prokofiev-like grotesquerie of the outer movements and the focus on individual instrumental tone colors throughout (highlighted by his use of an alto saxophone in the opening dance).  The opening three-note motif, introduced quietly but soon reinforced by heavily staccato chords and responsible for much of the movement's rhythmic vitality, is reminiscent of the Queen of Shemakha's theme in Rimsky-Korsakov's opera The Golden Cockerel, the only music by another composer that he had taken out of Russia with him in 1917.

The Symphonic Dances combine energetic rhythmic sections, reminiscent of Stravinsky's The Rite of Spring, with some of the composer's lushest harmonies. The rhythmic vivacity, a characteristic of Rachmaninoff's late style, may have been further heightened here for two reasons. First, he had been encouraged by the success of his Rhapsody on a Theme of Paganini as a ballet in 1939 and wanted to write something with which to follow it up. Second, he may have included material intended for a ballet titled The Scythians, begun in 1914–15 but abandoned before he left Russia. While no manuscript for the ballet is known to have survived, this does not make his quoting the work inconceivable, given Rachmaninoff's remarkable memory. He could remember and play back accurately pieces he had heard years earlier, even those he had heard only once.

The work is remarkable for its use of the alto saxophone as a solo instrument. He was apparently advised as to its use by the American orchestrator and composer Robert Russell Bennett. The composition includes several quotations from Rachmaninoff's other works, and can be regarded as a summing-up of his entire career as a composer. The first dance ends with a modified quotation from his unfortunate First Symphony (1897), here nostalgically rendered in a major key. The ghostly second dance was called "dusk" in some sketches. The final dance is a kind of struggle between the Dies Irae theme, representing Death, and a quotation from the ninth movement of his All-night Vigil (1915), representing Resurrection (the lyrics of the All-night Vigils ninth movement in fact narrate mourners' discovery of Christ's empty grave and the Risen Lord). The Resurrection theme proves victorious in the end (he wrote the word "Hallelujah" at this place in the score).

Instrumentation
The work is scored for an orchestra of piccolo, 2 flutes, 2 oboes, cor anglais, 2 clarinets, bass clarinet, alto saxophone, 2 bassoons, contrabassoon, 4 horns, 3 trumpets, 3 trombones, tuba, timpani, triangle, tambourine, side drum, cymbals, bass drum, tamtam, xylophone, glockenspiel, tubular bells, harp, piano, and strings.

Movements

Arrangements

Concert
Rachmaninoff wrote an arrangement for two pianos concurrently with the orchestral version. This arrangement was first performed by the composer with Vladimir Horowitz at a private party in Beverly Hills, California in August 1942.

Ballet
The name Symphonic Dances suggests that the composition can be danced to. Rachmaninoff corresponded with choreographer Michel Fokine about possibly creating a ballet from the Dances. He played the composition for Fokine on the piano; the choreographer responded enthusiastically. Fokine's death in August 1942 put an end to any possible collaboration in this direction.

In the 1980s, Joseph Albano choreographed the dances for the Albano Ballet in Hartford, Connecticut. In 1991, Salvatore Aiello choreographed the Symphonic Dances for the North Carolina Dance Theater. Peter Martins did so in 1994 for the New York City Ballet. Alexei Ratmansky choreographed Symphonic Dances for Miami City Ballet in 2012.Edwaard Liang did so in 2012 for the San Francisco Ballet. Liam Scarlett, as Artist In Residence choreographed the Symphonic Dances for The Royal Ballet, performed as part of a Quad billing at the Royal Opera House in Covent Garden, London in 2017.

Two organs
There exists a transcription of the entire piece by French composer/performer Jean Guillou, written for two organs.

Piano solo
There exists an unpublished transcription of the entire piece by the late Israeli pianist/composer/arranger Yahli Wagman, written between 1982-1986, for piano solo. 
There also exists a recording of Rachmaninoff playing through the piano reduction for Eugene Ormandy, during which he sings, whistles and talks about how he thinks the Dances should be performed. Rachmaninoff played the first movement coda differently to the score; these minor changes were reproduced by the pianist Stephen Kovacevich when he performed the work with Martha Argerich at his 75th birthday concert at Wigmore Hall.

Recordings

 Eugene Ormandy, conducting the Philadelphia Orchestra
 Dimitri Mitropoulos, conducting the New York Philharmonic Orchestra (1942)
 Nikolai Golovanov, conducting the USSR State Radio Symphony Orchestra, (1944 – 1st and 3rd mts, 1949 – 2nd mt)
 Yevgeny Svetlanov, conducting the State Academic Symphony Orchestra of the Russian Federation
 Kirill Kondrashin, conducting the Moscow Philharmonic Orchestra
 Kirill Kondrashin, conducting the Concertgebouworkest (Concertgebouw, 1976)
 Mariss Jansons, conducting the St Petersburg Philharmonic Orchestra
 Yuri Temirkanov, conducting the St Petersburg Philharmonic Orchestra
 André Previn, conducting the London Symphony Orchestra
 Vladimir Ashkenazy, conducting the Concertgebouw Orchestra
 Lorin Maazel, conducting the Berliner Philharmoniker
 Sergiu Comissiona, conducting the Vancouver Symphony Orchestra
 Eiji Oue, conducting the Minnesota Orchestra
 Predrag Gosta, conducting the London Symphony Orchestra
 Enrique Bátiz, conducting the Royal Philharmonic Orchestra
 Robert Spano, conducting the Atlanta Symphony Orchestra
 Donald Johanos, conducting the Dallas Symphony Orchestra
 Eugene Goossens, conducting the London Symphony Orchestra
 Sir Simon Rattle, conducting the Berliner Philharmoniker
 Martha Argerich & Nelson Goerner, at Edinburgh International Festival 2011 (version for two pianos)
 Nina Schumann & Luis Magalhães, TwoPianists Records (Version for two pianos)
 Valery Gergiev, conducting the London Symphony Orchestra
 Semyon Bychkov, conducting the WDR Symphony Orchestra Cologne
 Valery Polyansky, conducting the State Symphony Capella of Russia
 Sir Charles Mackerras, conducting the Royal Liverpool Philharmonic Orchestra
 Erich Leinsdorf, conducting the Rochester Philharmonic Orchestra
 Leonard Slatkin, conducting the Detroit Symphony Orchestra
 Vladimir Ashkenazy & Andre Previn, Decca Records (version for two pianos)
 Martha Argerich & Nelson Freire, at Salzburg Festival 2009 (version for two pianos)
 Yannick Nézet-Séguin, conducting the Philadelphia Orchestra, 2021
 John Eliot Gardiner, conducting the NDR Sinfonieorchester

Notes

References
Norris, Gregory, ed. Stanley Sadie, The New Grove Dictionary of Music and Musicians (London: Macmillan, 1980), 20 vols. .

Maes, Francis, tr. Pomerans, Arnold J. and Erica Pomerans, A History of Russian Music: From Kamarinskaya to Babi Yar (Berkeley, Los Angeles and London: University of California Press, 2002). .

 David Brown, Liner notes to Deutsche Grammophon recording conducted by Mikhail Pletnev
 Liner notes to Reference Recordings recording conducted by Eiji Oue
 Michael Steinberg, San Francisco Symphony program notes, under External links
 Bennett, Robert Russell. George J. Ferencz, editor. The Broadway Sound: The Autobiography and Selected Essays of Robert Russell Bennett  (University of Rochester Press, 1999)

External links
 Ormandy and Rachmaninoff
 Recording on 2 Pianos at Pandora Records
 Rachmaninov and the Day of Wrath inkpot.com
 San Francisco Symphony Program Notes by Michael Steinberg

Compositions by Sergei Rachmaninoff
Compositions for symphony orchestra
Orchestral suites
Compositions for two pianos
1940 compositions